Gonzalo Zaldumbide (25 December 1884 – 30 November 1965) was an Ecuadorian writer and diplomat, born in Quito. He was ambassador to Paris, minister of Foreign Relations (1929) and ambassador to London (1950).

He married pianist and teacher Isabel Rosales Pareja. The couple had a daughter, pianist Celia Zaldumbide Rosales.

Bibliography
 De Ariel, La evolución de Gabriel d'Annunzio (París, 1909)
 Ventura García Calderón, El único gran poeta de nuestro siglo XVIII.

References

People from Quito
Ecuadorian male writers
Ecuadorian diplomats
Ambassadors of Ecuador to France
1965 deaths
1884 births
Ambassadors of Ecuador to the United Kingdom
Ambassadors of Ecuador to Chile